Zálezly is a municipality and village in Prachatice District in the South Bohemian Region of the Czech Republic. It has about 300 inhabitants.

Administrative parts
Villages of Bolíkovice, Kovanín and Setěchovice are administrative parts of Zálezly.

References

Villages in Prachatice District